Africa Is Not a Country: Notes on a Bright Continent is a 2022 nonfiction book written by Dipo Faloyin.

References

2022 books